Kumari Penn is a 1966 Indian Tamil-language film, directed by T. R. Ramanna and produced by E. V. Rajan. The film stars Ravichandran and Jayalalitha, with S. V. Ranga Rao and Nagesh in supporting roles. It was released on 6 May 1966. The film was remade in Hindi as Man Ka Meet in 1968, in Malayalam as Rathimanmadhan and in Kannada as Hudugatada Hudugi.

Plot

Cast 
Ravichandran as Kanthan
Jayalalitha as Shyamala
S. V. Ranga Rao as Ranganathan
Nagesh as Sattanathan
Prabhakar as Doctor
R. S. Manohar as Devarajan
Sedhupathy as Ramalingam
Ennatha Kannaiah as Rathnam
C. K. Saraswathi as Seetha
S. N. Lakshmi as Kanthan's mother

Soundtrack 
The music was composed by M. S. Viswanathan, with lyrics by Kannadasan.

References

Bibliography

External links 
 

1960s Tamil-language films
1966 films
Films directed by T. R. Ramanna
Films scored by M. S. Viswanathan
Tamil films remade in other languages